Ani Moneva (born 3 March 1964) is a Bulgarian swimmer. She competed in the women's 4 × 100 metre medley relay at the 1980 Summer Olympics.

References

External links
 

1964 births
Living people
Bulgarian female swimmers
Olympic swimmers of Bulgaria
Swimmers at the 1980 Summer Olympics
Place of birth missing (living people)